is a Japanese composer and arranger of music from Osaka Prefecture, Japan, best known for his work on anime soundtracks. He has also done sound production work on albums for Mayumi Iizuka.

Works

Anime
Pygmalio (opening and ending themes arrangement, 1990–1991)
Locke the Superman: New World Command (1991)
Magical Princess Minky Momo (2nd series, 1991)
Legend of the Galactic Heroes: Golden Wings (1992)
Genki Bakuhatsu Ganbaruger (1992–1993)
Jeanie with the Light Brown Hair (opening theme, 1992–1993)
Mikan Enikki (1992–1993)
Nekketsu Saikyō Go-Saurer (1993–1994)
Wedding Peach (1995–1996)
Starship Girl Yamamoto Yohko (first OVA series, 1996)
Tenchi in Tokyo (ending theme 2, 1997)
D.N.Angel (2003)
DearS (2004)
Gokusen (2004)
Kujibiki Unbalance (second stage, 2006)
Dōbutsu no Mori (2006)
Nana (2006–2007)
Sayonara, Zetsubou-Sensei (2007)
Majin Tantei Nōgami Neuro (2007–2008)
Quiz Magic Academy (2008)
(Zoku) Sayonara, Zetsubou-Sensei (2008)
Cookin' Idol I! My! Mine! (2009)
Mysterious Girlfriend X (2012)
Locodol (2014)

Sources:

Films
Crêpe (1993)
Shura ga Yuku 6: Tōhoku Gekitōhen (1997)
The Summer of Dioxin (2001)
Suicide Club (2002)
Noriko's Dinner Table (2005)
Exte (2007)
Yes, No, or Maybe? (2020)

Sources:

TV programs
Nameshite Gatten (NHK, 1995)

Video games
Gradius III (arrangement, 1989, soundtrack released in 1990)
Rise of the Phoenix (Koei, 1995)
Romance of the Three Kingdoms VII (Koei, 2000)

Sources:

Sound production
Hasegawa did sound production work on one or more songs from these albums.
Mayumi Iizuka
Kata Omoi (1997)
Minto to Kuchibue (1998)
Fly Ladybird Fly (1998)
So Loving (1999)
Aeris (2000)
Himawari (2001)
Niji no Saku Basho (2002)
SMILE×SMILE (2003)
∞Infinity∞ (2004)
Mine (2005)
10LOVE (2006)
Crystal Days (2007)
Stories (2008)
Fight!! (2009)Kimi e... (2009)

References

External links
 Official site

1957 births
Anime composers
Japanese film score composers
Japanese male film score composers
Japanese music arrangers
Japanese television composers
Living people
Male television composers
People from Ikeda, Osaka
Video game composers